The Cross Keys is a pub in Crown Street, Dagenham, London.

The timber-framed building is Grade II listed and dates back to the 15th century.

References

External links
 

Grade II listed pubs in London
Timber framed buildings in London
Pubs in the London Borough of Barking and Dagenham
Grade II listed buildings in the London Borough of Barking and Dagenham